Strong Style Evolved was a professional wrestling event promoted by New Japan Pro-Wrestling (NJPW). The show took place on March 25, 2018, in Long Beach, California, United States at the Walter Pyramid. The event was broadcast on AXS TV in the United States and on NJPW World internationally.

Production

Background
On November 5, 2017, NJPW announced the follow-up event to G1 Special in USA, the event, titled Strong Style Evolved, would take place on March 25, 2018, at the Walter Pyramid in Long Beach, California. Tickets for the event sold out within 20 minutes of being made available for purchase.

To coincide with the event, NJPW held "Strong Style Saturday" on March 24 at the newly opened NJPW LA Dojo. The event included a fan festival featuring autograph sessions, a contract signing for the IWGP United States Heavyweight Championship title defense, and in-ring matches.

Storylines
On January 28, 2018, at The New Beginning in Sapporo, "Switchblade" Jay White defeated Kenny Omega to become IWGP United States Heavyweight Champion. Following the match, White was challenged by Omega's Bullet Club stablemate Hangman Page. A championship match between the two was announced for Strong Style Evolved on February 26.

On February 10, 2018, at The New Beginning in Osaka,  former WWE wrestler Rey Mysterio Jr. made his NJPW debut in a pre-taped video,  challenging Jyushin Thunder Liger to a match at Strong Style Evolved. Liger, who was on commentary, accepted the challenge and the match was later announced for the event. On March 3, Mysterio suffered a bicep injury at a Northeast Wrestling event, leading to Mysterio being replaced by Will Ospreay at Strong Style Evolved.

In July 2008, Canadian wrestler Kenny Omega started his first Japanese tour with the DDT Pro-Wrestling (DDT) promotion, where he quickly became friends with Kota Ibushi, with the two forming a tag team named "Golden☆Lovers" in January 2009. On October 3, 2014, Omega announced he was leaving DDT and signing with NJPW, where Ibushi was already a semi-regular. However, with Ibushi having recently moved to NJPW's heavyweight division, Omega stated that the Golden☆Lovers were done as a tag team due to him wanting to remain in the junior heavyweight division. The Golden☆Lovers wrestled their final match together on October 26, 2014, when they defeated Danshoku Dino and Konosuke Takeshita in Omega's DDT farewell match. 
On January 28, 2018 at The New Beginning in Sapporo, the Golden☆Lovers were reformed, with Ibushi  saving Omega from an attack from Cody. Omega and Ibushi teamed for the first time since 2014 at the Honor Rising: Japan 2018 events. At night two of Honor Rising: Japan, the Golden☆Lovers, after a victory over Cody and Marty Scurll, were interrupted by The Young Bucks who announced they were moving up to NJPW's heavyweight tag team division. A match between Golden☆Lovers and The Young Bucks was announced for Strong Style Evolved on February 26.

Results

Aftermath
At the show, NJPW announced there will be another G1 Special event taking place in the San Francisco area on July 7, 2018, at the Cow Palace in Daly City, California. The following day on March 26, NJPW announced the follow up to Strong Style Evolved,  Strong Style Evolved UK, occurring on June 30 and July 1.

See also
NJPW Invasion Tour 2011
G1 Special in USA
World Wrestling Peace Festival
Global Wars
ROH/NJPW War of the Worlds
Strong Style Evolved

References

External links
Official sub-site

New Japan Pro-Wrestling shows
2018 in professional wrestling
March 2018 events in the United States
Professional wrestling in California
Events in California
2018 in California